Billudden is a nature reserve in Uppsala County, Sweden.

Billudden is the outermost part of Uppsalaåsen; here the esker forms a promontory into the sea before disappearing from sight underwater. Areas of windblown sand and sparse Scots pine woods can also be found in the nature reserve. The nature reserve furthermore contains the largest concentration of common sea buckthorn in Europe and several unusual fungi. There are two nature trails with information about the nature of the reserve intended for the educational use of both grown ups and children in the reserve.

There is a former fishing hamlet called Billhamn on the promontory. It lies next to a natural harbour which formed during the last ice age when an ice block of unusually large proportions melted here, creating a circular indent in the shoreline. Today there are no permanent residents and the houses are used as holiday homes.

References

Nature reserves in Sweden
Geography of Uppsala County
1979 establishments in Sweden